Hungarian Studies is a biannual peer-reviewed academic journal covering Hungarian studies. It was established in 1985 and is the official journal of the International Association for Hungarian Studies. The founding editor-in-chief is Mihály Szegedy-Maszák, while the current editor-in-chief is Andrea Seidler.

The journal is abstracted and indexed by Scopus.

References

External links

Hungarian studies
Publications established in 1985
Multilingual journals
European studies journals
Biannual journals
Academic journals published by learned and professional societies
Akadémiai Kiadó academic journals